Azadegan Rural District may refer to:
 Azadegan Rural District (Kerman Province)
 Azadegan Rural District (Mazandaran Province)